Parrakie, South Australia is a small town on the Mallee Highway and Pinnaroo railway line approximately 26 kilometres west of Lameroo. The name is derived from the Aboriginal word perki which means cave or limestone sink hole. The town was surveyed in 1907.

The town is surrounded by large properties growing mostly cereal grains and livestock.

There is a Lutheran Church, town hall, post office and payphone.  There is also a cricket club and tennis courts on the other side of the railway line, south of the town.  A primary school opened in 1910 and closed in 1964.

The 2016 Australian census which was conducted in August 2016 reports that Parrakie had a population of 105.

Parrakie is located within the federal division of Barker, the state electoral district of Hammond and the local government area of the Southern Mallee District Council.

References

External links

Towns in South Australia
Murray Mallee